Dinghoua is a genus of flowering plants belonging to the family Celastraceae.

Its native range is Northern Queensland.

Species
Species:
 Dinghoua globularis (Ding Hou) R.H.Archer

References

Celastraceae
Celastrales genera